Joseph Arthur Gaston "Gus" Leroux (January 9, 1913 – August 29, 1988) was a Canadian professional ice hockey defenceman who played two games in the National Hockey League for the Montreal Canadiens. He was born in Montreal, Quebec.

External links

1913 births
1988 deaths
Canadian ice hockey defencemen
Ice hockey people from Montreal
Montreal Canadiens players